Walter Waring may refer to:

 Walter Waring (1667–1724), Member of Parliament (MP) for Bishop's Castle 1689–1690 and 1690–1695
 Walter Waring (1726–1780), MP for Bishop's Castle 1755–1759
 Walter Waring (Liberal politician) (1876–1930), MP for Banffshire (1907–1918), Blaydon (1918–1922), and Berwick & Haddington (1922–1923)
 Walter Waring (died 1780), British politician